Quality Hill, also known as the John Thomson Mason House, is a historic building, located at 3425 Prospect Street, Northwest, Washington, D.C., in the Georgetown neighborhood.

History
John Thomson Mason, a nephew of George Mason, bought the house in 1798.
John and Elizabeth Teakle bought the house in 1807.
Dr. Charles Worthington bought the house in 1810.
Albert Adsit Clemons, owner of Halcyon House bought the house in 1915.
Senator and Mrs. Claiborne Pell bought the house in 1961. Since 2019 the house has served as the Washington, DC headquarters of the Calvin Coolidge Presidential Foundation.

References

External links
 

Houses on the National Register of Historic Places in Washington, D.C.
Houses completed in 1788
1788 establishments in Maryland
Georgetown (Washington, D.C.)